De Witt Lee Sumners is an American mathematician, having been the Robert O. Lawton Distinguished Professor at Florida State University. He is known for his research in knot theory, topological fluid dynamics, and their application to DNA.

Sumners earned his Ph.D. in 1967 from the University of Cambridge under the supervision of John F. P. Hudson. He retired in 2007, and became a professor emeritus. In 2012, he was named as one of the inaugural Fellows of the American Mathematical Society.

References

Year of birth missing (living people)
Living people
Florida State University faculty
Alumni of the University of Cambridge
20th-century American mathematicians
American mathematicians
Topologists
Fellows of the American Mathematical Society
Place of birth missing (living people)